George H. Brickner (January 21, 1834 – August 12, 1904) was a German-born American Democratic politician.

He was born in Ansbach, Bavaria, in what is now Germany. He immigrated to the United States in 1840 with his parents, settling in Seneca County, Ohio. He attended the public schools. He was a merchant in Tiffin, Ohio. He moved to Cascade, Wisconsin in 1855. He owned flour and woolen mills in Wisconsin and operated a glass factory in Tiffin, Ohio. Brickner married Anna Elizabeth Ogle in September 1858. He was elected as a Democrat to the United States House of Representatives from Wisconsin for three consecutive terms, which comprised the 51st, 52nd and 53rd United States Congresses. He was elected as the representative of Wisconsin's 5th congressional district and served from March 4, 1889, to March 3, 1895. He died in Sheboygan Falls, Wisconsin.

References

External links
Honorable George H. Brickner Biography

1834 births
1904 deaths
People from Ansbach
People from Tiffin, Ohio
People from Sheboygan County, Wisconsin
Businesspeople from Ohio
Businesspeople from Wisconsin
Democratic Party members of the United States House of Representatives from Wisconsin
19th-century American politicians
German emigrants to the United States
19th-century American businesspeople